Notre Dame High School is a Catholic intermediate school and high school in Ottawa's west operated by the Ottawa Catholic School Board. The school is one of the first in the area to use a uniform.

The school is mainly two storeys throughout, except for the northeast corner where it features a basement in which the classrooms are almost exclusively for mathematics.  It has an auditorium.  It used to feature a single gymnasium in the centre of the school, but an extra one was built and opened in 2002–2003.  Sports teams play under the moniker/nickname "Notre Dame Eagles" (formerly the Notre Dame Silver Eagles).  The present site at 710 Broadview was once the site of Highland Park Technical School.  Notre Dame High School moved into the 710 Broadview site during the mid-1990s, from their old site on the north west corner of the Holland Ave-Queensway intersection. That site is now Fisher Park Public School.

The high school operates on a standard semestered system for grades 7-12. Grade 7-8 students take their classes in a separate wing of the school.

History

Initially, Notre Dame was located on Heron Road and was an all-girls school. In 1968, St Pat's School for boys moved to the campus and shared the chapel, theatre and other facilities with Notre Dame. In 1971, a few classes became blended from the 2 schools. In 1972, the senior grades from both schools were eliminated due to financial constraints, as there was not government funding for Catholic high schools in Ontario. In 1973, the nuns who ran Notre Dame were forced to close the doors. Students from Notre Dame had to attend public schools or go to St. Joes or St. Pius. A "new" Notre Dame was once again created after full funding for Ontario catholic schools was announced and the former St. Joseph and St. Raymond high schools (both grade 9-10) were merged into one school serving grade 9-OAC students. The school was relocated from its previous location on Holland Avenue in 1994. 

It is a very multicultural school, and houses Grades 7 to 12. The enrollment for the 2020-2021 school year was 270 Grade 7-8 students  and 455 Grade 9-12 students.

Uniform

The school has a uniform, consisting of either unisex pants, unisex shorts, unisex kapris, white and gray unisex polo shirts, white and gray unisex long sleeved polo shirt, and for girls a kilt, a wrap-around skirt, a navy skirt and a fitted blouse. The uniforms are manufactured by Top Marks co. for the school, while several other companies provide accessories with the Notre Dame logo, some of which can be used as uniform.

Activities

Senior high school students are offered overseas trips each year usually surrounding the battles of the Second World War; more recently students have visited Vimy Ridge and Ortona with other Canadian high schools. Students also participate in the regional Cappies competition, and have worked with Nepean High School to gather used snow suits for the Broadview Mission.

Transportation

A free OC Transpo bus pass is given to Grade 7-8 students who live more than 1.6 km away and Grade 9-12 students who live more than 3.5 km away from the school.

See also
List of high schools in Ontario
List of Ottawa schools

References

Sources
150 years of Catholic Education in Ottawa-Carleton 1856-2006, Ottawa-Carleton Catholic School Board, 2006

High schools in Ottawa
Catholic secondary schools in Ontario
Educational institutions established in 1968
1968 establishments in Ontario
Middle schools in Ottawa